The Freestylers are a British electronic music group, consisting of producers Matt Cantor and Aston Harvey.  They have released five studio albums and a number of mix compilations for, among others, Fabric and BBC Radio.

The group took their name from their first sample "Don't Stop the Rock" by Freestyle, which they also sampled on Drop the Boom.

Career

Formation–Raw as Fuck album (1996–2004)
The Freestylers formed in 1996 when DJs and dance music producers Matt Cantor, Aston Harvey joined forces. Both of them had been involved in the British dance music scene since the early 1990s. Cantor had recorded both as Cut & Paste and Strike with Andy Gardner (Plump DJs). Aston Harvey recorded as Blapps! Posse best known for their 1990 breakbeat dance hit "Don't Hold Back" before working with Definition of Sound, Rebel MC and DJ Rap (as DJ Rap and Aston).

The trio's first single "Drop the Boom (AK-48)" on their own Scratch City Records in 1996 became a dancefloor hit in the UK and Miami. The band released the Freestyle EP in 1996 on Freskanova (Freskanova's parent label, Fresh, had released Cantor and Harvey's previous works). When playing live, the group consisted of Cantor and Harvey on keyboards and programming, turntablist Jason Tunbridge (Mad Doctor X), guitarist (Tony Ayiotou), drummer Clive Jenner, bass guitarist Joe Henson, MC Navigator and Tenor Fly and three breakdancers (Coza, Marat, Lil'Tim).

The band released their first album, We Rock Hard, in 1998. The single "B-Boy Stance" became a hit in the UK in 1998 featuring the contributions of rapper Tenor Fly. In 1999, the Freestylers enjoyed success in the U.S. with track "Don't Stop" reached number 8 in the Billboard dance charts and the video for "Here We Go" becoming hit on a MTV . We Rock Hard sold well in the US, selling over 150,000 and reaching the top 30 of the Billboard Heatseeker chart.

Following the success of B-Boy Stance, the band were asked to remix tracks by Audioweb, Afrika Bambaataa and the Jungle Brothers as well as a big beat compilation album FSUK 2 and a Radio 1 Essential Mix featuring Beenie Man, Public Enemy, Whodini and The Fall.

The Freestylers released a mix album, Electro Science, in 2000. Their second album, Pressure Point, was released in 2001 with the track "Get Down Massive" featuring Navigator reaching number 16 on the Billboard dance charts in 2002.

During 2002 and 2003, the group began releasing singles under the alias Raw As Fuck, which later became the title of their third studio album. Released in 2004, it featured the single "Push Up", which reached the top 30 in the UK and top 3 in Australia. The song "Get A Life", which was released as the album's first single, was re-released and reached the top 20 in Australia.

Adventures in Freestyle (2006) and current activity
Released in 2006 album Adventures in Freestyle experimented with a variety of styles, and saw the Freestylers working with assorted underground vocalists.

In 2008, the song "Jump 'n' Twist" from their fourth studio album "Adventures in Freestyle" was featured in the soundtrack for Tiger Woods PGA Tour 2008.

In 2010 the remixes of "Cracks" (originally from the Past, Present and Future E.P.) was released through Never Say Die Records. The Flux Pavilion remix received 25 million hits on YouTube.

CTRL-Z, hailing from Hammersmith and individually known as DJ Dash (Tom Petais) & DJ Inch (Nicky D’Silva), have been very involved with The Freestylers' music. In 2009, their remake of "Ruffneck" (renamed "Ruffneck '09") became the first ever release of the Never Say Die Records label. They have also remixed "Security" in 2007 and "Cracks" in 2010. CTRL-Z has also co-produced songs with The Freestylers, such as "Turn to Dust" from the Adventures in Freestyle album.

In 2012, Freestylers signed with Black Hole Recordings subsidiary Rub-A-Duck Records. Through the label, they have released singles such as "Frozen" and "Over You", as well as their latest album The Coming Storm in 2013. 2012 also saw new member Chris Bishop (Screwface from Stereo:Type) joining the production team.

Since the release of their album "The Coming Storm the band have now been releasing their new material on Instant Vibes partially owned by Krafty Kuts. The single "Rude Bwoy" features Jamaican dancehall artist RDX.

The new album "Other Worlds" is out August 2021.

Discography

Albums

DJ mixes/compilations
Essential Mix (BBC Radio 1) (1998)
FSUK2 (1998)
Rough Technique Vol. 1 (1998)
Electro Science (2000)
FabricLive.19 (2004)
A Different Story Vol. 1 (2007)

Singles/EPs

References

External links
Official Freestylers website
 

Breakbeat music groups
English electronic music groups
Musical groups from London
DJs from London
British musical trios